Stony Brook is a tributary of Mehoopany Creek in Wyoming County, Pennsylvania, in the United States. The brook has a tributary known as Red Brook. Logging was done in the upper reaches of the watershed of Stony Brook in the early 1900s.

Course
Stony Brook begins in North Branch Township. It enters a valley and flows southeast for approximately two miles (three kilometers) before turning south and entering Forkston Township. Shortly afterwards, the brook receives the tributary Red Brook and turns east. Further downstream, it bends south and then southwest before it reaches its confluence with Mehoopany Creek.

Tributaries

Geography and geology

There are two conglomerates in the vicinity of Stony Brook. Coal is also found close to the brook. By the late 1800s, a thousand tons of coal had been mined in the area.

Watershed

History and industries
Logging has historically taken place in the watershed of Stony Brook. Most of this wood was spruce.

Biology
Stony Brook is inhabited by native trout. It is well-known to locals for this reason.

See also
Henry Lott Brook, next tributary of Mehoopany Creek going downstream
Somer Brook, next tributary of Mehoopany Creek going upstream
List of rivers of Pennsylvania

References

Rivers of Wyoming County, Pennsylvania
Rivers of Pennsylvania
Tributaries of Mehoopany Creek